20th Street station (also signed as Dogpatch) is a light rail station on the Muni Metro T Third Street line in the Dogpatch neighborhood of San Francisco, California. The station opened with the T Third Street line on January 13, 2007. It has two side platforms; the northbound platform is north of 20th Street, and the southbound platform south of 20th Street, so that trains can pass through the intersection before the station stop.

References

External links 

SFMTA: Third Street & 20th St northbound, southbound
SF Bay Transit (unofficial): Third Street & 20th St

Muni Metro stations
Railway stations in the United States opened in 2007